Wangen is a village and a former municipality in the Burgenlandkreis district, in Saxony-Anhalt, Germany. Since 1 July 2009, it is part of the town Nebra.

The first documented mention of the village was in the Hersfeld Tithe Register in the late 9th Century.

Former municipalities in Saxony-Anhalt
Burgenlandkreis